Ethiopia–Poland relations are the bilateral relations between Ethiopia and Poland. Relations began in November 1930, during the coronation of Emperor Haile Selassie. Soon after, the Polish chargé d'affares came from Cairo to Addis Ababa. In 1934, both countries signed a Treaty of Friendship, Trade and Settlement. However, it did not come to effect due to the Italian invasion of Ethiopia. 

In September 1963, relations were reinstated after Emperor Haile Selassie made an official visit to Poland and was decorated with Order of Polania Restituta, accompanied by the signature of two treaties, one on Cultural Cooperation, and the other Scientific and Technical Cooperation. Following the Ethiopian Revolution and the seizure of power by the communist Derg in 1974, the two countries enjoyed friendly relations and signed numerous agreements on trade, aviation, loans, culture and media. Various Ethiopian scholars also stayed in Poland during this period.

In May 2017, Polish President Andrzej Duda made the first visit by a Polish leader to Ethiopia, as well as the first in Sub-Saharan Africa. One year later in April 2018, Ethiopian President Mulatu Teshome made the first official visit by an Ethiopian president to Poland to discuss economic and political cooperation. Poland and Ethiopia have little economic relations between each other, and Ethiopia was only 114th partner in foreign trade turnover with Poland as of 2020.

History
Poland–Ethiopia relations started on the beginning of 1930s, when the first Polish chargé d'affares came from Cairo to Addis Ababa during the coronation of Emperor Haile Selassie. Shortly after, the Ethiopian envoy in Paris officially visited Poland for the first time. In 1934, the two countries signed the Treaty of Friendship, Trade and Settlement (Polish: Traktat o Przyjazni, Handlu I Osadnictwie), however it went foiled by the Italian invasion occurred shortly after. 

In 1946, the Cairo legation of Ethiopia suggested renovation of the two diplomatic relations. On 3 October 1947, Zygmunt Kuligowski, the Special Envoy and the Minister Plenipotentiary, presented his accreditation letters to Haile Selassie. At this time the Ethiopian Envoy accreditation in Moscow got the letter in Warsaw. Between 1947 and 1960, the two relations were minimal with causal engagements. In 1960, the Polish Legation and the Office of Commercial Counselor began to operate in Addis Ababa. One year later in 1961, Polish–Ethiopian diplomatic missions raised in Addis Ababa and Moscow to the rank of embassies.

Furthermore, it had since renovated advanced in September 1963 when the Emperor decorated with Grand Cross of the Order of the Rebirth of Poland (Polonia Restituta), accompanied by signature of two treaties, on Cultural Cooperation, and on Scientific and Technical Cooperation during the visit. Poland also helped by providing subsidies for Ethiopian students and sent to Ethiopia experts on various fields. This was a time where Polish movies were set up in festival in Ethiopia.

Following the Ethiopian Revolution and the installation of the Derg to power in 1974, it was approved by the authorities of the Polish People's Republic. Since then, they strengthened their respective mutual visits by representatives and signed numerous accords on trade, aviation, loans, culture and media. During this time, a number of Ethiopian scholars in Poland increased significantly.

1989–present
At the end of 1992, the Polish Embassy in Ethiopia was shut down due to budget cuts as its duties were deputed to the Polish Embassy in Yemen. It reopened in mid-2003. In May 2017, Polish President Andrzej Duda made official visit in Ethiopia, the first in Sub-Saharan Africa. Together with the Ethiopian President Mulatu Teshome and Prime Minister Hailemariam Desalegn held consultations on political and economic cooperation between the two countries.  

During the next visit at African Union forum, Poland assured to cooperate with African countries in the context of Poland membership in the United Nations Security Council.  In April 2018, President Mulatu Teshome made a visited to Poland met with President Andrzej and Prime Minister Mateusz Morawiecki. At this time, Polish and Ethiopian Ministry of Foreign Affairs consultation took place. Both representatives sat together in the UN Security Council. A letter of intent regarding academic cooperation was signed.

Economic relations

Economic relations between the two countries are relatively small. As of 2020, Ethiopia was 114th partner in foreign trade turnover, with exports from Poland reached 2,585 million USD, while the import from Ethiopia reached 1,088 million USD.

Science field relations
During President Multatu's visit to Poland in 2018, both parties signed a letter of intent on the academic cooperation. In 2020, 26 Ethiopian students received Polish Lukasiewicz scholarship.

References

Foreign relations of Ethiopia
Foreign relations of Poland
Ethiopia–Poland relations